Jack Cleary may refer to:
 Jack Cleary (footballer, born 1911), Australian rules footballer for Fitzroy
 Jack Cleary (footballer, born 1922), Australian rules footballer for Hawthorn
 Jack Cleary (rower), Australian rower

See also
 John Cleary (disambiguation)